Robert A. Kierlin (born June 1, 1939) is an American businessman and former politician.

Born in Winona, Minnesota, Kierlin graduated from Cotter High School in Winona. He received his bachelor's and master's degrees from University of Minnesota. In 1967, Kierlin helped found Fastenal in Winona, Minnesota. He served in the Minnesota State Senate 1999-2007 as a Republican.

Notes

1939 births
Living people
People from Winona, Minnesota
University of Minnesota alumni
Businesspeople from Minnesota
Republican Party Minnesota state senators
21st-century American politicians